This was the first edition of the tournament.

Thomas Fabbiano won the title after defeating Zhang Ze 5–7, 6–1, 6–3 in the final.

Seeds

Draw

Finals

Top half

Bottom half

References
 Main Draw
 Qualifying Draw

Zhuhai Challenger - Singles
Zhuhai Open